The Journal of Mathematical Analysis and Applications is an academic journal in mathematics, specializing in mathematical analysis and related topics in applied mathematics. It was founded in 1960, as part of a series of new journals on areas of mathematics published by Academic Press, and is now published by Elsevier. For most years since 1997 it has been ranked by SCImago Journal Rank as among the top 50% of journals in its topic areas.

References

Elsevier academic journals
Mathematics journals
Mathematical analysis